Small Arms and Light Weapons (SALW) refers in arms control protocols to two main classes of man-portable weapons.

 "Small arms", broadly speaking, are individual-service (i.e. for carry and operation by individual infantrymen) kinetic projectile firearms.  These include: handguns (revolvers, pistols, derringers, and machine pistols), muskets/rifled muskets, shotguns, rifles (assault rifles, battle rifles, carbines, designated marksman rifles, short-barreled rifles, sniper rifles, etc.), submachine guns, personal defense weapons, squad automatic weapons, and light machine guns.
 "Light weapons", broadly speaking, are infantry-portable weapons that are either crew-served kinetic firearms, incendiary devices, or shoot explosive munitions. These include: anti-materiel rifles, anti-tank rifles, general-purpose machine guns, medium machine guns, unmounted heavy machine guns, portable flamethrowers, grenades, rifle grenades, underslung grenade launchers, grenade launchers, automatic grenade launchers, recoilless rifles, rocket-propelled grenades, man-portable anti-tank missiles, man-portable air-defense systems, and mortars under  caliber.

Small Arms and Light Weapons also include ammunition, explosives, hand grenades, land mines, and any other man portable weapons not listed above.

In contrast, the term "heavy weapons" generally refers to any other weapon systems that are too cumbersome for foot transportation and hence have to rely on fixed mounting platforms installed upon wheeled frames/vehicles, vessels, aircraft or fortifications for effective operation.

Definition by international legal conventions 
According to the United Nations Office on Drugs and Crime, the international framework on firearms is composed of three main instruments: the Firearms Protocol, the United Nations Programme of Action to Prevent, Combat and Eradicate the Illicit Trade in Small Arms and Light Weapons in All Its Aspects (Programme of Action, or PoA) and the International Instrument to Enable States to Identify and Trace, in a Timely and Reliable Manner, Illicit Small Arms and Light Weapons (International Tracing Instrument, or ITI), where only the Firearms Protocol is legally binding.

The ITI, adopted by the United Nations General Assembly on 8 December 2005, defines small arms and light weapons as:

Such arms control policies and treaties are focused on international arms trafficking (importation and export), and in the standardization of laws, protocols and sharing of law enforcement information and best practices across nations to prevent illicit arms sales. They also focus on terrorism, arms proliferation as a humanitarian concern, disarmament in the face of extreme violence, and cases of ameliorating anarchy, civil war and international conflict. SALW provisions are generally not oriented towards imposing or enforcing domestic national or local legislation of legitimate gun ownership or sale.

United Nations SALW control efforts 
Small arms and light weapons are used in conflicts around the world, causing injury and death. Small arms control was first broached by UN Resolution A/RES/46/36 (December 1991), which was expanded upon by A/RES/50/70 (January 1996). This latter resolution mandated a panel of experts to research the type of small arms and light weapons being used in the world's conflicts and to study which weapons might apply to fall under an arms control regime.  The recommendations of expert reports returned to the General Assembly, A/52/298 (1997) and A/54/258 (1999) led to a July 2001 United Nations Conference on the Illicit Trade in Small Arms, with a follow-up in July 2006.

On 26 September 2013 the UN Security Council passed Resolution 2117, which urged nations to remain committed to small arms embargoes and SALW control protocols.

Work on SALW via the United Nations is coordinated by the Office for Disarmament Affairs (UNODA), though the UN Coordinating Action on Small Arms (CASA) mechanism, which comprises 21 UN departments and agencies working on different aspects of small arms and light weapons control. The United Nations Institute for Disarmament Research (UNIDIR), carries out research in arms control affairs and has published many articles and books related to small arms and light weapons.

On 2 April 2013, the UN General Assembly voted overwhelmingly to adopt the Arms Trade Treaty (ATT) to govern the legal international trade in many types of conventional weapons, from warships and aircraft to small arms and light weapons. A basic obligation of the treaty is that all States Parties should establish or maintain controls in the area. In this way, the treaty also helps the international community to address unregulated or illegal trade in conventional weapons. The treaty opened for signature on 3 June 2013. To date, two-thirds of UN member states have signed the treaty (130 states), and 72 have ratified it. The treaty entered into force on 24 December 2014.

Global distribution of small arms 

In 2018, Small Arms Survey reported that there are over one billion small arms distributed globally, of which 857 million (about 85 percent) are in civilian hands. U.S. civilians alone account for 393 million (about 46 percent) of the worldwide total of civilian held firearms. This amounts to "120.5 firearms for every 100 residents." The world's armed forces control about 133 million (about 13 percent) of the global total of small arms, of which over 43 percent belongs to two countries – the Russian Federation (30.3 million) and China (27.5 million). Law enforcement agencies control about 23 million (about 2 percent) of the global total of small arms.

See also 
 List of firearms
 List of most-produced firearms
 Small arms
 Small Arms Survey
 Small arms trade
 Arms Trade Treaty
 Gun control
 Gun politics

References

External links 
 Arms Sales Monitoring Project at the Federation of American Scientists (FAS)
 Small Arms and Light Weapons at United Nations Office for Disarmament Affairs (UNODA)
 Control Arms campaign
 Coordinating Action on Small Arms United Nations Programme of Action, Implementation Support System
 International Action Network on Small Arms (IANSA)
 Mines Advisory Group (MAG)
 Project On Government Oversight (POGO) "small arms" search results
 Small Arms Survey
 SALW Knowledge Base at South Eastern and Eastern Europe Clearinghouse for the Control of Small Arms and Light Weapons (SEESAC)
 United Nations Coordinating Action on Small Arms
 United Nations Institute for Disarmament Research
 UK Foreign & Commonwealth Office: Small Arms and Light Weapons
 The Wassenaar Arrangement on Export Controls for Conventional Arms and Dual-Use Goods and Technologies

Arms control
Firearms
Gun politics